Vaddiraju Ravichandra is an Indian politician. He is a Member of Parliament, representing Telangana in the Rajya Sabha the upper house of Indian Parliament as a member of the Telangana Rashtra Samithi. Ravichandra, popularly known as Gayatri Ravi, is the Founder Chairman of Gayatri Group, president of Telangana Granite Quarry Owners Association and also the honorary President of the Telangana Munnuru Kapu All Association JAC and the National Union of Backward Castes.

Personal life
Vaddiraju Ravichandra was born in Inugurthy village, Kesamudram mandal, Mahabubabad district of Telangana on 22 March, 1964 to Narayana and Venkata Narsamma.

Political Life
Vaddiraju Ravichandra  contested 2018 Telangana Legislative Assembly election as congress candidate from Warangal East Assembly constituency and he lost the election to Nannapuneni Narender of the TRS. He later Joined TRS party in 2019. Ravichandra has been nominated for the by-election caused by the resignation of TRS member Banda Prakash on 18 May 2022 and was unanimously elected to the Rajya Sabha on 23 May 2022.

References

Rajya Sabha members from Telangana
21st-century Indian politicians
Telangana Rashtra Samithi politicians
1964 births
Living people